Rajeewa Weerasinghe (born 26 August 1987) is a Sri Lankan cricketer. He made his first-class debut for Badureliya Sports Club in the 2006–07 Premier Trophy on 15 Decenver 2006.

References

External links
 

1987 births
Living people
Sri Lankan cricketers
Badureliya Sports Club cricketers
Colts Cricket Club cricketers
Lankan Cricket Club cricketers
Place of birth missing (living people)